Alexander James Hughes (born 3 October 1975) is a British priest in the Church of England. Since 2014, he has been the Archdeacon of Cambridge.

Early life and education
Alex was born in Honiara, the Solomon Islands, to John and Jill Hughes. He grew up in Southampton and Seaford, England, and was educated at Lewes Priory and Eton College . He read theology at Oxford University then entered Westcott House, Cambridge to train for ordained ministry. He also completed an MPhil and PhD at St Edmund's College, Cambridge.

Ordained ministry
Alex was ordained in the Church of England as a deacon in 2000 and a priest in 2001. He served his curacy at Holy Trinity, Headington Quarry, Oxford. In 2003, he moved to the Diocese of Portsmouth, where he was Chaplain to Kenneth Stevenson, Bishop of Portsmouth, then parish priest at St Luke's and St Peter's in Somerstown, Portsmouth. Since 2014, he has been Archdeacon of Cambridge in the Diocese of Ely and an honorary canon of Ely Cathedral.

Personal life
In 1998, Alex married Sarah. She is a psychotherapist. They have two sons.

References

1975 births
Living people
People from Honiara
People educated at Priory School, Lewes
People educated at Eton College
Alumni of Greyfriars, Oxford
Alumni of St Edmund's College, Cambridge
Alumni of Westcott House, Cambridge
Archdeacons of Cambridge